= Brankciems =

Neighbourhood of Jūrmala, Latvia

Coordinates: 56°56′N 23°36′E

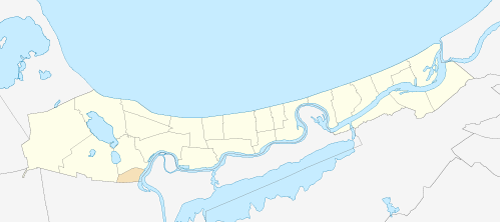
- Location in Jūrmala
- Country: Latvia
- City: Jūrmala

Area
  - Total: 1.3 km^{2} (0.50 sq mi)
- Elevation: 3 m (9.8 ft)

Population (2008)
  - Total: 12
  - Density: 9.2/km^{2} (24/sq mi)

Brankciems is a residential area and neighbourhood of the city Jūrmala, Latvia.
